Bebearia ikelemba is a butterfly in the family Nymphalidae. It is found in the Democratic Republic of the Congo.

Subspecies
Bebearia ikelemba ikelemba (Democratic Republic of the Congo: Equateur and Tshopo)
Bebearia ikelemba kamituga Berger, 1981 (Democratic Republic of the Congo: southern Kivu)

References

Butterflies described in 1901
ikelemba
Endemic fauna of the Democratic Republic of the Congo
Butterflies of Africa